The 2012 Russian Cup was held in Penza, Russia from 12–17 June 2012.

Medal winners 
The Russian Cup — featuring team, all-around and individual events — is the last competitive chance for on-the-bubble gymnasts to prove themselves worthy of Olympian status.

Powered by superstars Aliya Mustafina and Viktoria Komova, Moscow ran away with the women's title on Wednesday, which also served as the qualification for all-around and event finals.

External links
 https://web.archive.org/web/20140421081817/http://www.sportgymrus.ru/contest/archive/7730/default.aspx

References

Cup of Russia in artistic gymnastics
2012 in gymnastics
Russian Cup